Hillview is located in north west Singapore.  The neighbourhood overlooks Bukit Timah Hill, hence its name.

Ecology
Hillview is naturally endowed with lush greenery as it is encircled by the woodlands of Bukit Gombak to the west, Bukit Batok Nature Park to the south and Bukit Timah Nature Reserve to the east. Nearby are several other nature parks, such as Hindhede Nature Park, Dairy Farm Nature Park, Chestnut Nature Park and the upcoming Rifle Range Nature Park.

History

Industrial Past
From the early 1940s to the late 80s, Hillview was an industrial precinct with facilities such as Old Ford Motor Factory (built in 1941), Castrol Oil Company, Union Carbide, Cycle & Carriage Daimler-Benz car assembly plant (built in 1965), and Hume Pipe Company factory with lease to the land granted in 1927. At where Hume Pipe Company factory was located is now Hume Avenue. Today, only the old Ford Motor factory still remains as other factories made way for new private residential developments.

The KTM Malayan Railway used to operate passenger and freight services that ply through Hillview, from Malaysia in the north to Tanjong Pagar railway station in the south. Of significance are two railway truss bridges spanning across the undulating terrain near Hillview. Under a bilateral agreement signed between Singapore and Malaysia in 2010, the railway land was handed back to Singapore. Since then, the railway land has largely been kept untouched and actively redeveloped as a green corridor, with access points being gradually added throughout the 24-km stretch of land. It includes a new bridge over Hillview Road slated to be completed in 2024.

Second World War
Located just beside Bukit Timah Hill, the area witnessed one of the fiercest military encounters in Singapore during World War II as Bukit Timah held strategic and tactical importance to both the Japanese and the British. The Ford Motor Factory most notably served as the venue on 15 February 1942 for the formal surrender of the Malayan Peninsula by the British Commanding Officer, Lt-Gen. Arthur Ernest Percival, to the Japanese Commander of the 25th Army, Gen. Yamashita Tomoyuki.

Infrastructure

Princess Elizabeth Estate, which was previously located along Hillview Avenue's Elizabeth Drive, was built around 1951 to commemorate the wedding of Princess Elizabeth (later Queen Elizabeth II) to Prince Philip (the Duke of Edinburgh) in 1947.

There were also public housing built by the Housing Development Board (HDB) around 1979 at the north end of Hillview, with a community centre, a wet market, a hawker centre and some neighbourhood shops. In 1999, the government announced that the HDB estate would be relocated to Bukit Gombak via the largest Selective En-bloc Redevelopment Scheme (SERS). The residents started the relocation in 2003-2005. By late 2005, the last HDB estate was demolished. Today, as one of the affluent residential areas in Singapore, Hillview boast several private condominiums and landed properties. It is served by nearby restaurants, delicatessens, watering holes, cafes, convenience stores, and a suburban shopping mall, HillV2. The Hillview Community Club, located close to the Hillview MRT station, was opened in 2019.  

Hillview is served by the Hillview MRT station via the Downtown Line.  To coincide with the new Rail Corridor and reinvention of Old Bukit Timah Fire Station, an upcoming Hume MRT station will be opening in 2025. There is a plan to extend Dairy Farm Road into Hillview Rise to enable an alternative route into Hillview. Also there is a potential commercial development at No.2 Hillview Road where the old Standard Chartered Building was.

References

Places in Singapore
Bukit Batok